Seita Vuorela (formerly Seita Parkkola; 15 March 1971 – 20 April 2015) was a Finnish author of young adult novels and photographer.

Studies and work
Seita Vuorela lived in Helsinki, where she worked as an author and photographer and taught creative writing. Her young adult novels have been translated into many languages, including Swedish, English, French, Italian, and German. She studied literature and philosophy at the University of Jyväskylä and the University of Turku.

Prizes
She was nominated for the Finlandia Junior Award in 2002 and 2006. In 2011, she won the French prize Pépite du roman ado européen for her novel Viima. In 2013, she won the first ever Nordic Council Children and Young People's Literature Prize together with illustrator Jani Ikonen for the fantasy novel Karikko.

The book Lumi was nominee for the 2016 Finlandia Prize and was chosen as readers' favourite.

Works
Susitosi (2001), with Niina Repo
Ruttolinna (2002), with Niina Repo
Jalostamo (2004), with Niina Repo
Viima (The School of Possibilities) (2006)
Lupaus (2007), Rajat Express vol. 1, with Niina Repo
Loisto (2008), Rajat Express vol. 2, with Niina Repo
Usva (2009)
Karikko (2012), with Jani Ikonen
Lumi (2016), posthumous

Awards
Pépite du roman ado européen, 2011
Nordic Council Children and Young People's Literature Prize, 2013

References

21st-century Finnish women writers
Writers of young adult literature
1971 births
2015 deaths
Finnish women photographers